127 (one hundred [and] twenty-seven') is the natural number following 126 and preceding 128. It is also a prime number.

 In mathematics 
As a Mersenne prime, 127 is related to the perfect number 8128. 127 is also the largest known Mersenne prime exponent for a Mersenne number, which is also a Mersenne prime. It was discovered by Édouard Lucas in 1876 and held the record for the largest known prime for 75 years.
 is the largest prime ever discovered by hand calculations as well as the largest known double Mersenne prime.
There are a total of 127 prime numbers between 2,000 and 3,000.
127 is also a cuban prime of the form ,  . The next prime is 131, with which it comprises a cousin prime. Because the next odd number, 129, is a semiprime, 127 is a Chen prime. 127 is greater than the arithmetic mean of its two neighboring primes; thus, it is a strong prime.
127 is a centered hexagonal number.
It is the seventh Motzkin number.
127 is a palindromic prime in nonary and binary.
127 is the first Friedman prime in decimal. It is also the first nice Friedman number in decimal, since , as well as binary since  .
127 is the sum of the sums of the divisors of the first twelve positive integers.
127 is the smallest prime that can be written as the sum of the first two or more odd primes: .
127 is an isolated prime where neither p-2 nor p+2 are prime.
127 is the smallest digitally delicate prime in binary.
127 is the 31st prime number and therefore it is the smallest Mersenne prime with a Mersenne prime index.
127 is the largest number with the property 127 = 1*prime(1) + 2*prime(2) + 7*prime(7). Where prime(n) is the n-th prime number. There are only two numbers with that property, the other one is 43.
127 is the number of different ways in which 10,000 can be expressed as the sum of two prime numbers.

In the military
  was a Mission Buenaventura-class fleet oilers during World War II 
  was a United States Navy transport ship
  was a United States Navy 
  was a United States Navy  in World War II
  was a United States Navy 
  was a United States Navy  for removing naval mines

In religion
 The biblical figure Sarah died at the age of 127.
 According to the Book of Esther, the Persian Empire under Ahasuerus consisted of 127 provinces "from India to Ethiopia".
 Havamal Stanza 127 is used as a declaration against folkish traditions of Heathenry and specifically the Asatru Folk Assembly.

In transportation
 The small Fiat 127 automobile
 London Buses route 127 is a Transport for London contracted bus route in London
 127 is the number of many roads, including U.S. Route 127
 STS-127 was a Space Shuttle Endeavour mission to the International Space Station which launched on June 15, 2009
In other fields
 127 Hours is a film released in 2010
 The year AD 127 or 127 BC
 127 AH is a year in the Islamic calendar that corresponds to 744 – 745 CE
 127 Johanna, a Main belt asteroid
 127 film, a film format
 The atomic number of Unbiseptium, an element that has not yet been discovered
 The LZ 127 Graf Zeppelin, a dirigible
 Sonnet 127 by William Shakespeare
 127th Street Ensemble was a troupe of African-American actors which included Tupac Amaru Shakur
 NCT 127, K-pop boy group under SM Entertainment
 In IP (Internet Protocol) Version 4, it is the last Class A network and is also the subnet used for loopback functionality in computer networking
 The highest signed 8-bit integer, using two's complement
 The non-printable "Delete" (DEL) control character in ASCII.
 Linotype (and Intertype) machines used brass matrices with one of 127 possible combinations punched into the top to enable the matrices to return to their proper channel in the magazine.
 127 is the smallest positive integer, n, such that n centimeters is a whole number of inches. 127 cm is exactly 50 inches.

 See also 
 127th (disambiguation)
 List of highways numbered 127
 United Nations Security Council Resolution 127

References

 Wells, D. The Penguin Dictionary of Curious and Interesting Numbers'' London: Penguin Group. (1987): 136 - 138

Integers